The Samuel scroll is a collection of four manuscript fragments containing parts of the Book of Samuel which were found among the Dead Sea Scrolls.

The Book of Samuel at Qumran 

What is commonly known as two books in many Christian Bibles, 1 and 2 Samuel form a single book (Books of Samuel) in the Masoretic text as well as in the manuscripts found at Qumran. Of the four fragments of Samuel found at Qumran, one was discovered in Cave 1 and three more in Cave 4.

1Q Samuel 

1Q Samuel (1QSam; 1Q7) was found in Cave 1 and contains remnants of a manuscript that contained parts from 1 Samuel 18 and 2 Samuel 20:6-10, 21:16-18, and 23:9-12. The variants within this text include a missing long stretch in 20:8, as well as some peculiar readings of proper nouns (21:18, 23:9). The text is in Hebrew, written in square script and dates from the Hellenistic-Roman period.

4Q Samuela 
4Q Samuela (4QSama; 4Q51) was found in Cave 4 at Qumran, and dates from 50-25 BCE ("Herodian" period). The text is in Hebrew and written in square script. This scroll is the most extensive, and it preserves fragments of 1 Samuel 1 - 2 Samuel 24. It contains many readings that are different from the Masoretic Text but that closely resemble those in the Septuagint. Some examples are as follows: 
 1 Samuel 1:23 in 4QSama reads, "only the Lord establish what proceeded out of your mouth", while the Masoretic Text reads, "only the Lord establish his word". 
 1 Samuel 1:24 in 4QSama reads, "with a three-year-old [bullock]; Masoretic reads "with three bullocks".
 1 Samuel 2:17 in 4QSama reads, "for they (namely Eli’s sons) dealt contemptuously with the offering of the Lord"; the Masoretic Text reads, "for the men (namely the worshippers or Eli's sons helpers, according to some exegetes) dealt contemptuously with the offering of the Lord".

4Q Samuelb 
4Q Samuelb (4QSamb; 4Q52) was found in Cave 4 at Qumran and contains parts of 1 Samuel 16:1-11, 19:10-17, 20:26-21:10, and 23:9-17. It is the oldest of the four manuscripts, dating to the end of the third century/beginning of second century BCE ("Early Hellenistic" period). The text is in Hebrew and written in square script. The orthography is similar to that of the Masoretic Text in the Pentateuch, and shares many readings with both the Septuagint (such as the designation of Samuel as "the seer" in 1 Samuel 9:18,19) and the Masoretic Text (as in 1 Samuel 20:34, "on the second day of the new moon" that reads against the Septuagint's "on the second of the month." The Masoretic Text and Samuelb imply a two-day feast for the New Moon while the Septuagint tells of a one-day New Moon followed by an ordinary day).

4Q Samuelc 
4Q Samuelc (4QSamc; 4Q53), also found in Cave 4 at Qumran, was written by the same scribe who wrote the Rule of the Community, as shown by the orthography and the specific spellings of words such as z'wt ("this"), 'bdkh ("your servant") and wy’wmr ("and he said"). These variants are quite insignificant, however, and do not relate directly to the Masoretic Text (MT) or the Septuagint. One variant that is found in both the scroll and the Septuagint is in 2 Samuel 14:30. The MT ends with the note of the burning of Joab's field, but the Septuagint continues on and recounts how Joab's servants told him about it "with their clothes rent". The scroll reads, "[and the s]ervants of Joab [came] to him, with [their clothes] rent [and said 'the ser]vants of Absalom [have set] the field on fire'." The text is in Hebrew, written in square script and dates from Hasmonean period.

New perspectives on passages from the Qumran Samuel finds

Height of Goliath 

One major variation in the Samuel text is in 1 Samuel 17:4. The Septuagint writes, "καὶ ἐξῆλθεν ἀνὴρ δυνατὸς ἐκ τῆς παρατάξεως τῶν ἀλλοφύλων Γολιὰθ ὄνομα αὐτῶν ἐκ Γέθ, ὕψος αὐτοῦ τεσσάρων πήχεων καὶ σπιθαμῆς·" The translation of this verse reads, "And there went forth a mighty man out of the army of the Philistines, Goliath, by name, out of Geth, his height [was] four cubits and a span.". Furthermore, In Josephus' account of this story, he writes, "Now there came down a man out of the camp of the Philistines, whose name was Goliath, of the city of Gath, a man of vast bulk, for he was of four cubits and a span in tallness ... ." However, because the Masoretic Text was written in the original Hebrew language and was considered to be an older version of the text, scholars used its translation for years, attributing to Goliath a height that surpassed even that of the tallest man ever recorded in medical history.

With the discovery of the Dead Sea Scrolls, in which the manuscript containing 1 Samuel 17:4 is found in original Hebrew and can be dated to over 1000 years before the Masoretic Text, the height of Goliath as four cubits and one span is not only a confirmation of the readings in the Septuagint and in Josephus, but is also a far more reasonable height for a man and not a medical impossibility. As time went on, the ancient narratives became more exaggerated as the passage was copied and recopied many times. Even in later Septuagint manuscripts, Goliath's height is recorded as "five cubits" and in an even later manuscript as "six cubits", exemplifying how ancient narratives were sometimes exaggerated as they were retold and rewritten by narrators or scribes. Perhaps the story of a young and unarmored David defeating a mighty Philistine warrior would have seemed all the more miraculous the taller Goliath was, contributing to an even more heroic image of David as a leader later on in life as he put his faith in God and defeated countless adversaries. With David being a key character in the narrative of Scripture, such exaggeration in the telling of this story is understandable.

Missing section from 1 Samuel 10 

According to the Masoretic Text (MT) and Septuagint (LXX), Saul returns home and a month following, Nahash the Ammonite declares that he will only make a treaty with the people of Jabesh-gilead if he can gouge out everyone's right eye. This cruel and strange punishment seems out of place within the text. For punishment of this kind was meant for those who discretely or violently rebelled.

However, 4QSama, which was copied in around 50 BCE, interpolates a passage describing similar treatment of the Gadites and Reubenites considered to bring clarity to the text. This portion is found in column 10. The additional passage from the Samuel scroll has been integrated by the translators of the New Revised Standard Version. This version is the first of its kind to do so.
          

Thus, the Samuel scroll found at Qumran includes a lengthier text than that of the traditional Masoretic Text and Septuagint. It provides readers with two key pieces of information: 1. It was common for Nahash to gouge out people's right eyes; 2. the 7,000 men that fled from the Ammonites had taken refuge in Jabesh-gilead, which is why the city was being treated by Nahash as a stronghold for rebels. Therefore, the harsh behaviour and brutal punishment of the Ammonite Nahash has been illuminated by the additional excerpt in 4QSama, allowing its readers to comprehend the text by explaining the book's complicated history.

Additionally, this fragment was included by Josephus in his Antiquities of the Jews, who may have adopted these writings from texts similar to 4QSama. Josephus wrote of Nahash's clever practice of putting out the right eyes of warriors, leaving them useless in battle when their left eye was covered by their shield (5.1, 386). For those who committed insurrection or rebellion against him, he would give the ultimatum of either, cutting "off a small member of their body, or universally perish[ing]" (5.1, 387). Consequently, the Qumran texts and Josephus himself combine to form our "two most ancient witnesses", demonstrating the validity of the missing segment from 1 Samuel 10 and thus must be considered valuable revelation.

However, the question remains as to why this portion is missing from the Masoretic Text and Septuagint. Dead Sea Scrolls scholars indicate that its exclusion is possibly due to "mechanical or scribal errors" that occurred during the copying of the text. Furthermore, Emanuel Tov, professor at the Hebrew University of Jerusalem notes that these verses were most likely accidentally omitted in the earliest stages of copying. In accordance to Tov, professor of Theology at the University of Notre Dame, Eugene Ulrich writes that a number of scribal errors occurred by the hand of a Masorete ancestor(s) that were never corrected in the later traditions of the Masoretic Text. Thus, while scholars acknowledge that this topic is problematic, there are no concrete explanations for its occurrence, only weighted assumptions concerning the human scribes and their transmission.

References

1947 archaeological discoveries
Dead Sea Scrolls
Books of Samuel
Goliath